Change Colours is the third studio album by British-Australian recording artist Reece Mastin, released on 9 October 2015 by Social Family Records. It is the first studio album released by Mastin since leaving Sony Music Australia, and the follow-up to his 2015 extended play Rebel and the Reason. The album is described as a rock album "high on raw feelings, with songs ripped straight out of real-life experiences that cut to the heart of the matter". It was announced and became available for pre-order on 11 September 2015.

Content and themes
Several songs on the album are about Mastin's split with Home and Away actress Rhiannon Fish, which, according to Mastin, was less than amicable. Mastin claims "there was a lot of arguing" but they ended on "good terms". Mastin states he wrestled with being so honest on the record but writing about how he felt proved to be "therapeutic". The album also documents anxiety and depression, with Mastin noting severing ties with Sony Music Australia and the 2014 Lindt chocolate café hostage crisis as having an impact on him.

Reception
Aneta Grulichova of The Music awarded Change Colours two-and-a-half stars out of five, saying; "Reece Mastin was reborn with his EP Rebel and the Reason; now his new record has left rock'n'roll fans high and dry with a mushy, sad album." Australian Music Magazine gave the album 4 out of 5 stars, saying that it's a "raw, honest record that we love, and we hope more of Australia can change their opinion of Reece, this is the new Reece."
Lauren Katulka of music review website Sound of Oz said about the album: "Change Colours isn’t like the other Reece Mastin albums, and that’s exactly why it’s so special. It showcases the work of a young artist that is releasing music he believes in, perhaps for the first time. If you’ve dismissed him as just another reality show winner, it's probably time to rethink your stance."

Change Colours debuted on the ARIA Album Chart at number 12, falling to number 72 in its second week. Change Colours also debuted on the ARIA Australian Artist Album Chart at number 5.

Release and promotion
Change Colours was released on 9 October 2015 as both a digital download and on CD. Mastin made a number of in-store appearances, performances and signing throughout October across New South Wales, Victoria, Queensland and Western Australia to support the album.

Singles
In late September, Mastin asked his fans to vote on which song they thought should be the album's first single. It was announced on 1 October via Twitter that "Even Angels Cry" had been chosen. It premiered on The Kyle and Jackie O Show on KIIS 106.5 the same day. It was released on 2 October. "Heartache Blues" was confirmed as the second single with a release date of 22 April 2016.

Track listing

Charts

Release history

References

2015 albums
Reece Mastin albums
Social Family Records albums